Route 311 is a collector road in the Canadian province of Nova Scotia.

It is located in Colchester County and connects Tatamagouche at Trunk 6 with Truro at Trunk 4.

Communities
Truro
Upper Onslow
North River
Central North River
Upper North River
Nuttby
Earltown
West Earltown
The Falls
Balfron
Waugh River
Tatamagouche

History

The entirety of Collector Highway 311 was once designated as Trunk Highway 11.

See also
List of Nova Scotia provincial highways

References

Nova Scotia provincial highways
Roads in Colchester County